Khlong Lat Mayom Floating Market is a floating market of Taling Chan District, Bangkok apart from Taling Chan and Wat Saphan Floating Markets.

It is located on  Bang Ramat Rd, Bang Ramat Subdistrict, Taling Chan District in Thonburi side, the market founded by Chuan Chuchan, a local farmer with the development of plantations and communities of villagers into new market and attraction since November 2004.

Highlights of this market were variety of Thai food such as grilled seafood, kai yang (Thai grilled chicken), som tam (papaya spicy sour salad), larb (Lao meat salad), pork satay, barbeque pork ribs and Thai sweets which many are rare dishes namely khanom khai pla (fish roe sweet), khanom ko (southern Thai sweet), khanom nim nuan (Rayong local sweet), etc. by customers who sit at low tables all along the khlong (canal).

In addition to food this market is also divided into six zones, selling many types of interesting goods, including clothes, handicrafts, local products, antiques, kid toys, home decorations, ornamental plants, fresh fruits and vegetables as well as fish spa therapy.

Moreover, visitors can take a boat from here to connect to the other two floating markets of Taling Chan, with can see the scenery on both sides of the khlong as well.

Khlong Lat Mayom Floating Market is operated only on Saturdays–Sundays and public holidays from 9:00 am to 5:00 pm.

Can be reached in addition to boating along the khlong, also take a songthaew (Thai-style minibus) from Siriraj Piyamaharajkarun Hospital for an eight baht fare.

References

External links

Floating markets in Thailand
Tourist attractions in Bangkok
2004 establishments in Thailand